St Martin's Comprehensive School is a comprehensive school in the County borough of Caerphilly in Mid Glamorgan, Wales. It is located in Caerphilly town. The school website states the aim of school is that "each individual student leaves us, having succeeded to the best of their ability."

Governors

Feeder schools 
The majority of the students would have attended prior to starting at the school one of the following primary schools:
Cwrt Rawlin Primary School
 Rhydri Primary
 St James Primary
 Plasyfelin Primary
 Coed-y-Brain Primary
 The Twyn School

External links 
 School website
 School twitter

References

Secondary schools in Caerphilly County Borough